Exalted is a comic book title produced by UDON Entertainment Corporation, based on the role-playing game Exalted. UDON published six issues of Exalted between 2005 and 2007.

The series follows a newly exalted Solar named Kidale, and includes in its cast several characters who had previously appeared in other works, such as Demetheus (from Castebook: Dawn) and Faka Kun (from Castebook: Night).  The brief storyline covers events from Kidale's Exaltation to his eventual death during a Wyld Hunt; while the story itself stops there, the events of it are occasionally referenced through the pre-chapter comics of the second edition of the RPG by the same name, until Return of the Scarlet Empress.

Notes

References

 

2007 comics endings
Comics based on games
Works based on role-playing games